The 1964 Haringey Council election took place on 7 May 1964 to elect members of Haringey London Borough Council in London, England. The whole council was up for election and the Labour party gained control of the council.

Background
These elections were the first to the newly formed borough. Previously elections had taken place in the Municipal Borough of Hornsey, Municipal Borough of Tottenham and Municipal Borough of Wood Green. These boroughs were joined to form the new London Borough of Haringey by the London Government Act 1963.

A total of 158 candidates stood in the election for the 60 seats being contested across 20 wards. These included a full slate from the Conservative and Labour parties, while the Liberals stood 18 candidates. Other candidates included 20 from the Communist party. There were 14 three-seat wards, 3 four-seat wards and 3 two-seat wards.

This election had aldermen as well as directly elected councillors.  Labour got all 10 aldermen.

The Council was elected in 1964 as a "shadow authority" but did not start operations until 1 April 1965.

Election result
The results saw Labour gain the new council with a majority of 22 after winning 41 of the 60 seats. Overall turnout in the election was 33.4%. This turnout included 1,097 postal votes.

Ward results

Alexandra-Bowes

Bruce Grove

Central Hornsey

Coleraine

Crouch End

Fortis Green

Green Lanes

High Cross

Highgate

Muswell Hill

Noel Park

Park

Seven Sisters

South Hornsey

South Tottenham

Stroud Green

Tottenham Central

Town Hall

Turnpike

West Green

References

1964
1964 London Borough council elections